Musa Mohammed is the name of:

Musa Mohammed (footballer), Kenyan footballer
Musa Mohammed (politician), Nigerian politician

See also
Musa Muhammed, Nigerian footballer